Rider-Lewis was a brass era automobile built first in Muncie and then Anderson, Indiana from 1908 to 1911.

History 
Ralph Lewis of Boston, designed an overhead valve, overhead cam six-cylinder engine of 40/45-hp.  George D. Rider financed manufacturing and the Rider-Lewis Motor Car Company was established.  Rider-Lewis introduced the automobile at the Indianapolis Motor Show in March 1908 priced at $2,500.  Production began in Muncie in a converted factory, though in 1909 the company moved to a newly built factory in Anderson, Indiana.

For 1910 the "Excellent Six" was joined by a four-cylinder Model Four automobile selling for $1,050,  .  In September 1910 the company was in receivership, though production continued. In October the Rider-Lewis property in Anderson was attached by court order when creditors thought Rider-Lewis was preparing to move out of state.  A few more Model Fours were built into early 1911, but by March the Rider-Lewis plant was sold to Nyberg Motor Works.

References

External links 
 Rider-Lewis, Nyberg Factory - Historic Structures
 
 Herald-Bulletin Article - 1 Factory 3 Cars by Beth Oljace, 2011
 Herald-Bulletin Article - Several Auto Factories by David Humphrey, 2013

Defunct motor vehicle manufacturers of the United States
Motor vehicle manufacturers based in Indiana
Vehicle manufacturing companies established in 1908
Vehicle manufacturing companies disestablished in 1911
Brass Era vehicles
1900s cars
1910s cars
Cars introduced in 1908